Davide Vitturini (born 21 February 1997) is an Italian footballer who plays as a right-back for  club Trento.

Club career
Born in L'Aquila, but raised in Florence and Pescara, Vitturini started playing football in two different grassroots teams before joining Pescara's youth academy, where he also played with Lucas Torreira. He made his debut with the first team on 2 December 2014, aged 17, in a Coppa Italia match against Sassuolo: his side lost 1–0 in the occasion. Just four days after, on 6 December 2014, he also made his league debut in the Serie B match against Pro Vercelli, which his side won 4–0. He gained another league appearance the following week, in the match against Avellino.

In the 2015 summer transfer window, Vitturini was sent on loan to Lega Pro team Teramo. However, Vitturini gained no playing time, and subsequently returned to Pescara in January 2016: he ended up being often used as a starter in the second part of the season in Serie B by Massimo Oddo, as the team reached promotion to Serie A following their victory in the play-offs.

Vitturini made his Serie A debut on 15 October 2016, in a 1–1 draw against Sampdoria. He collected other two consecutive appearances in the top flight, before picking up an injury that would force him to stop periodically and, eventually, lose the opportunity to take part in the FIFA Under-20 World Cup in 2017.

In the subsequent years, he would collect three consecutive loan spells with Carpi, Carrarese and Fano, although he could establish himself as a frequent starter only in the latter season.

On 15 January 2020, Vitturini signed a 1.5-year contract with Feralpisalò.

On 26 January 2021, Vitturini returned to Teramo, joining until the end of the season. He subsequently became a free agent at the end of June.

On 14 November 2022, Vitturini joined Trento in Serie C.

International career
Vitturini has represented Italy at every age group from U-16 to U-20, and has received call-ups to the U-21 squad.

With the Italian under-19 team, he took part at the UEFA European Under-19 Championship in 2016.

Personal life 
Vitturini studied at the Liceo Classico "Gabriele D'Annunzio" in Pescara, where he obtained his maturity diploma with a final score of 85/100.

He subsequently pursued and obtained (in November 2019) a degree in Business economics at the UniPegaso in Naples, where he has also pursued a professional degree in Sport management. He expressed the desire to work as a Director of Football following his retirement.

References

External links 
 

1997 births
People from L'Aquila
Sportspeople from the Province of L'Aquila
Footballers from Abruzzo
Living people
Italian footballers
Italy youth international footballers
Association football defenders
Delfino Pescara 1936 players
S.S. Teramo Calcio players
A.C. Carpi players
Carrarese Calcio players
Alma Juventus Fano 1906 players
FeralpiSalò players
FC Tsarsko Selo Sofia players
A.C. Trento 1921 players
Serie A players
Serie B players
Serie C players
First Professional Football League (Bulgaria) players
Universiade medalists in football
Universiade bronze medalists for Italy
Medalists at the 2019 Summer Universiade
Italian expatriate footballers
Expatriate footballers in Bulgaria
Italian expatriate sportspeople in Bulgaria